The Nan Lian Garden is a Chinese Classical Garden in Diamond Hill, Hong Kong near Diamond Hill station. It is designed in the Tang Dynasty-style with hills, water features, trees, rocks and wooden structures.

The garden was a joint project of the Chi Lin Nunnery and the Hong Kong Government. It opened to the public on 14 November 2006.

The garden is open daily from 7am to 9pm.

Gallery

References

External links

 Nan Lian Garden Web site
 Leisure and Cultural Services Department: Nan Lian Garden

Diamond Hill
Urban public parks and gardens in Hong Kong